The 1996 California Republican presidential primary was held on March 26, 1996 as a part of the Republican Party's statewide nomination process for the upcoming presidential election. Senator Bob Dole of Kansas gained nearly two-thirds of the vote against political commentator Pat Buchanan and publishing executive Steve Forbes.

Results

References

1996 California elections
1996 United States Republican presidential primaries by state
California Republican primaries